Parvan (also Romanized as Parvān and Parwān) is a village in Shahidabad Rural District, Central District, Avaj County, Qazvin Province, Iran. At the 2006 census, its population was 253, in 64 families.

References 

Populated places in Avaj County